Jang Eui-soo (born January 22, 1990) is a South Korean model and actor. He gained widespread popularity after starring in the BL drama Where Your Eyes Linger (2020).

Early life and education 
Jang Eui-soo was born on January 22, 1990, in Seoul, South Korea. He studied in Department of Model Acting at Kyungmoon College.

Career
Jang began his career as a model in 2008. He has attracted attention by working on various runways that had been walked on. Since then, he has made his face known to the public through various advertisements and music videos. Then he was discovered by the agent and signed with Elrise Entertainment (이엘 라이즈).

Jang made his acting debut in 2012, appearing in the drama series A Gentleman's Dignity. He followed up with his movie bow, in the 2015 film Northern Limit Line. He then starred in the film The Beauty Inside where he played one of Woo Jin's transformations. He was modeled for the Seoul Fashion Week (서울 패션 위크) in 2015, as well as for the SS14 Seoul Fashion Week. He has also participated in photo shoots for BNT International in March, 2015.

In 2018, he played supporting role as a martial arts fighter in hit dramas Bad Papa. In 2019, he starred in the fantasy rom-com drama He Is Psychometric where he played a young investigator. In the same year, he played his first leading role in the romance drama Jal Pa Gin Love.

In 2020, Jang rose to prominence for playing Kang-gook in the Korea's first BL drama Where Your Eyes Linger alongside Han Gi-chan. Jang received acclaim for his performance and experienced a surge in popularity.

Discography

Singles

As lead artist

Filmography

Television series

Film

References 

1990 births
Living people
21st-century South Korean male actors
South Korean male models
South Korean male television actors
South Korean male film actors
South Korean male web series actors
People from Seoul